The Archives du Maroc (est. 2007) is an archives in Rabat, Morocco, on Avenue Ibn Battouta. Jamaâ Baida became director in 2011. It opened to the public in 2013. Among its holdings are materials related to the colonial French protectorate in Morocco. The newly created Conseil national des archives (National Council on Archives) is expected to coordinate its activities with the Archives du Maroc.

See also
 Bibliothèque Nationale du Royaume du Maroc

References

Bibliography

External links

 Official site
 

Morocco
Historiography of Morocco
2007 establishments in Morocco
Rabat